Shambat is a city in Sudan and is located in the state of Khartoum. The University of Khartoum and the Sudan University of Science and Technology have agriculture campuses in Shambat.

References

Khartoum North
Populated places in Khartoum (state)
Populated places on the Nile